The Day of the Clown is the second serial of the second series of the British science fiction television series The Sarah Jane Adventures. It was first broadcast in two weekly parts on the CBBC channel on 6 and 13 October 2008. The Day of the Clown introduces main character Rani Chandra (Anjli Mohindra) and her parents, Haresh (Ace Bhatti) and Gita Chandra (Mina Anwar), and they would stay for the rest of the series.

Plot
Luke and Clyde meet Rani Chandra, a new pupil at school who has moved into Luke's street. Clyde and Rani are stalked by a clown who was spotted prior to the disappearance of Clyde's friend Dave Finn, one of several disappearances of children in the past two weeks. Sarah Jane and Clyde link the disappearances of the children to the Museum of the Circus, Clyde and two of the missing children having received tickets for it. Rani, who wants to become a journalist, begins her own investigation and makes the same connection to the Museum having found a ticket in a school book belonging to one of the missing children and having a ticket herself.

Sarah Jane and Clyde explore the Museum of the Circus and encounter Elijah Spellman. As Sarah Jane, Luke, Clyde and Rani attempt to escape the building, Spellman reveals himself to have been the legendary Pied Piper of Hamelin and now Odd Bob the Clown seeking to take children away and feed off the fear of children going missing. When Rani's phone goes off, electromagnetic rays interfere with Spellman's energy. Sarah Jane, Luke, Clyde, and Rani escape the museum, and Rani accepts Sarah Jane's invitation to fight aliens.

The next morning, Rani looks out of her bedroom window and sees Odd Bob's balloon in her garden. When she gets to the school she tells Luke and Clyde, then a load of balloons fall down from the sky, all the school children pick them up (apart from Luke, Clyde and Rani) and fall under the spell from Odd Bob, behaving much like the Pied Piper story. However, Mr Smith uses the cellular phone system to interfere with Odd Bob's control and the children are released. Odd Bob suddenly kidnaps Luke, takes him to a place between worlds. Clyde uses humour to dissipate Sarah Jane's fear. Odd Bob requires fear to exist, and without it, he is in a weakened state and forced to return to the meteorite he used to come to Earth. Subsequently, the recently disappeared children return. Sarah Jane puts the meteorite into a box from which nothing can escape.

Continuity
The First Doctor, John and Gillian first meet the Pied Piper in the comic Challenge of the Piper. This is also the first story to ever feature the Pied Piper in any Doctor Who media.
Chrissie Jackson is revealed to be getting married and her daughter, Maria, is expected to return for the wedding. 
Haresh Chandra replaces Mr Blakeman as Headteacher of Park Vale High School, Blakeman having seemingly disappeared during Revenge of the Slitheen. 
Clyde reminds Luke of the disappearing children and the alien Kudlak seen in Warriors of Kudlak. 
Sarah Jane refers to her Aunt Lavinia, who appeared in K-9 and Company and was first mentioned in The Time Warrior. We learn more about Sarah Jane's upbringing with her Aunt Lavinia. 
One of the clowns shown on Sarah Jane's laptop is a promotional photo of Carmen Silvera as Clara the Clown from the 1966 Doctor Who serial The Celestial Toymaker. 
Professor Rivers of the Pharos Institute previously appeared in The Lost Boy.

Outside references
After Sarah Jane reveals her fear of clowns, Luke reveals that he knows Johnny Depp is also coulrophobic having read it in Heat. Spellman outlines the history of clowns citing Pharaohs' fools, harlequins, Native American clowns and Mediaeval court jesters, and numerous references are made to the legend of The Pied Piper of Hamelin.

Broadcast and reception

Broadcast
"Part One" was first broadcast on the CBBC Channel at 5.15 p.m. on Monday 6 October 2008 and was repeated as part of CBBC on BBC One at 4.35 p.m. on Monday 13 October 2008. It was made available for 14 days after first broadcast on the BBC iPlayer. "Part Two" was first broadcast on the CBBC Channel at 5.15 p.m. on Monday 13 October 2008 and was repeated on BBC One at 4.35 p.m. on Monday 20 October 2008.

Critical reception
Writing for Dreamwatch, Matt McAllister asserts that there may not be "quite enough here to sustain a double-episode worth" but observes that there are "memorable scenes, including an ingenious final showdown." He states that Walsh is "appropriately sinister...as Odd Bob the Clown" and describes Rani as "likeable", noting that having her father as the new Headteacher is "a nice little twist". McAllister thinks that the story "owes a big debt to Stephen King's It" (1986) and that it has shades of Torchwood episode "From Out of the Rain" and Doctor Who serial The Greatest Show in the Galaxy. In conclusion, McAllister notes that "[t]his may not be earth-shattering kids' TV, but it’s good creepy fun nonetheless."

Novelisation

This was the eighth of eleven Sarah Jane Adventures serials to be adapted as a novel. Written by Phil Ford, the book was first published in paperback on 6 November 2008.

References

External links

The official BBC The Sarah Jane Adventures website
Press Pack information regarding The Day of the Clown at the BBC Press Office website

The Sarah Jane Adventures episodes
2008 British television episodes
Clowning
Works about clowns
Fiction about mind control
Television episodes about psychic powers
Works based on Pied Piper of Hamelin
Television episodes about child abduction